The Simbahan–Talagas Protected Landscape is a protected area in northern Aurora, Philippines that preserves a major watershed in the Sierra Madre mountain range of Central Luzon. It contains the headwaters of the Simbahan and Talagas rivers, including the Sangay River and Umihiem Creek in Dinalungan municipality which empty into the Casiguran Sound. A large portion of the park is under forest cover, while the remaining areas are cultivated land, shrubland, grassland, built-up area and river-wash area. Some of the park's fauna include the Philippine deer, Philippine long-tailed macaque, and an abundant species of avifauna. Its location in north central Sierra Madre is covered by dipterocarp forest, composed of Shorea almon (Philippine mahogany), Shorea polysperma (tanguile), Shorea squamata (mayapis), Shorea contorta (white lauan), Shorea negrosensis (red lauan), and Parashorea malaanonan (bagtikan).

First established as a watershed forest reserve in 1992, the  park was upgraded to a protected landscape area in 2000. It is one of five protected areas in the province of Aurora.

References

Protected landscapes of the Philippines
Geography of Aurora (province)
Protected areas of the Sierra Madre (Philippines)
Protected areas established in 1992
1992 establishments in the Philippines